Szcześniak or Szczęśniak is a gender-neutral Polish surname. Notable people with the surname include:

 Alina Surmacka Szczesniak (1925–2016), Polish-born, American food scientist
 Andrzej Leszek Szcześniak (1932–2003), Polish historian and educator
  (1908-1996), Polish historian 
 Małgorzata Szczęśniak (born 1954), Polish stage and costume designer
  (born 1964), Polish musician
 Rose Hemingway (née Sezniak or Szczesniak) (born 1984), American actress, performer and singer
 Taco Hemingway, Filip Tadeusz Szcześniak (born 1990), Polish rapper, songwriter, and musician 
 Tom Szczesniak, American musician and composer
  (1858–1926), Bishop of Warsaw 1925–1926

See also

Polish-language surnames

pl:Szcześniak